This is a list of episodes of the South Korean variety show Running Man in 2023. The show airs on SBS as part of their Good Sunday lineup.


Episodes

Upcoming episodes

Guests

Viewership

References

External links
  

Lists of Running Man (TV series) episodes
Lists of variety television series episodes
Lists of South Korean television series episodes
2023 in South Korean television